Charlie Chuck is the stage name of British comedian David Kear.

Biography
Kear began his career as a drummer with various bands in the late-1970s and early-1980s, including a stint with the Small Faces and the Amazing Bavarian Stompers with whom he performed on an edition of the children's television series Tiswas in 1981. In the late 1980s, he turned to solo stand-up comedy as the surreally manic  'Charlie Chuck' and, in 1990, he was talent-spotted by the comedian Malcolm Hardee who arranged for him to appear on Jools Holland's The Happening, a Sky TV series produced by Noel Gay Television.

He later appeared on the Sky TV talent show Sky Star Search where he was spotted by disc jockey James Whale, who booked him on several editions of his late night series The James Whale Radio Show (a radio show that was simultaneously broadcast on television by Yorkshire Television on the ITV Network).

In 1993-1995, he was a cast member of the BBC Two TV series The Smell of Reeves and Mortimer. He appeared performing his Charlie Chuck character act, but was always referred to on-screen as 'Uncle Peter'.

His long-running Charlie Chuck stage act often involved the destruction of a drum kit and was peppered by references to fantasy characters including One Eyed Dog, Cakey Pig and a Donkey. The words "Donkey!" and "Woof! Bark! Donkey!" shouted out more-or-less at random had been part of his Charlie Chuck act and became his 'Uncle Peter' catchphrases on the Reeves & Mortimer TV shows. As a result of these TV appearances, Paul McCartney became a fan and invited Chuck to perform at one of his birthday parties.

In 2001, he appeared as his Charlie Chuck character in a series of TV adverts for Cadbury's Double Decker chocolate bars, with music by Lester Barnes.

In 2002 he appeared at the Edinburgh Fringe in a comedy show  Charlie Chuck is Scrooge, very remotely based on the Charles Dickens character and, that same year, his company Charlie Chuck Productions also staged Scots comic Ian Watt's one-man Fringe show John Laurie, Frazer & I, which he directed as David Kear.

In 2004, he guest-starred in the Edinburgh Fringe show Nudge.

In 2006, he appeared as one of the acts in a 5-hour-long memorial tribute show  at London's Hackney Empire theatre in memory of his mentor the late Malcolm Hardee.

References

External links
 
 Charlie Chuck on Chortle

Living people
English male comedians
Year of birth missing (living people)